The Dublin Midlands Hospital Group is one of the hospital groups established by the Health Service Executive in Ireland.

History
The grouping of hospitals was announced by the Irish Minister for Health, Dr. James Reilly TD in May 2013, as part of a restructure of Irish public hospitals and a goal of delivering better patient care. The Group was given responsibility for the following hospitals:

Southern Dublin
St. James's Hospital, inner city Dublin
Coombe Women & Infants University Hospital, inner city Dublin
Tallaght University Hospital

Midlands counties
Naas General Hospital
Midland Regional Hospital, Portlaoise
Midland Regional Hospital, Tullamore

In April 2018, Dublin Midlands Hospital Group had to defend the level of its car parking charges.

Services
The Group is headed by a Chief Executive, who is accountable to the National Director for Acute Services in the Health Service Executive, and is responsibility for delivering inpatient care, emergency care, maternity services, outpatient care and diagnostic services at its designated hospitals. The Group’s designated cancer centre is St. James’s Hospital. The Group's academic partner is Trinity College Dublin.

References

External links
Official site

Hospital networks in Ireland
Health Service Executive
Medical and health organisations based in the Republic of Ireland